The women's high jump at the 2021 World Athletics U20 Championships was held at the Kasarani Stadium on 20 and 22 August.

Records

Results

Qualification
The qualification round took place on 20 August, in two groups, both starting at 10:15. Athletes attaining a mark of at least 1.85 metres ( Q ) or at least the 12 best performers ( q ) qualified for the final.

Final
The final was held on 22 August at 15:25.

References

High jump
High jump at the World Athletics U20 Championships
U20